Kenneth Wright may refer to:

 Kenneth Anthony Wright (1899–1975), English composer, conductor and TV musical director
 Kenneth W. Wright (born 1945), American Church of Christ minister
 Lester del Rey (1915–1993), American science fiction author who used the pen name "Kenneth Wright"
 Kenny Wright (born 1977), American football player
 Kenny Wright (footballer) (born 1985), Scottish footballer
 Ken Wright (auto racing mechanic) (born 1940), American race car driver and mechanic
 Ken Wright (baseball) (1946–2017), American baseball pitcher
 Ken Wright (footballer) (1922–1994), English footballer who played as a forward
 Ken Wright (politician) (1925–2019), Australian politician
 Ken Wright (rugby) (born 1957), Australian rugby union and rugby league player
 Kenneth Wright (engineer), American civil engineer; see Machu Picchu#Agriculture